Aroused is a 2013 feature-length documentary film directed by the photographer Deborah Anderson, in her directorial debut. It focuses on the lives and careers of 16 pornographic actresses. The film's structure includes interviews with the women both during makeup and during a subsequent photo shoot for Anderson's coffee table book of the same name as the documentary. Quotes are presented in title cards throughout the film on the topic from women including Erica Jong, Marlene Dietrich, and Gloria Leonard. The actresses interviewed describe their early upbringing, entry into sexual activity, and motivations for entering the adult film industry. A female talent agent within the industry, Fran Amidor, provides a counterpoint to the interviews. Several of the actresses recount facing stigma and discrimination due to their career choice. Katsuni reflects on the impact of entering the industry, and criticizes society's "judgment of morality".

Anderson was inspired to work on Aroused, after previously photographing an adult industry actress for a magazine shoot. She wanted to draw attention to a double standard in society regarding consumption of pornography while simultaneously stigmatizing the actresses that perform in the adult industry. She stated her attempt was to humanize and provide dignity to the actresses. Anderson cast the actresses in the film in order to showcase, "the most successful women in the adult film industry". Filming took place in Hollywood Hills, California; the film was shot in black and white, color, and muted color tones. The film premiered on May 1, 2013, at Nuart Theatre of the Landmark Theatres chain in Los Angeles. The film was released on iTunes and Amazon, followed by a DVD in June 2013.

Aroused received mixed to negative reviews. The film was compared by the Chicago Tribune to the documentary After Porn Ends with a more optimistic feel to it. Screen Daily and BroadwayWorld commented favorably on the vulnerability of the subjects. Film critics compared the documentary's style to Michael Moore, Annie Leibovitz and the film Naked Ambition: An R Rated Look at an X Rated Industry. A review of the film in the Los Angeles Times was critical, writing that it was only recommended for fans of Alexis Texas, Katsuni and Misty Stone. The Village Voice found the subject more appropriate for a photography book. The Hollywood Reporter and The Washington Post criticized Aroused for its lack of depth. The New York Times compared the film's cinematic style to an advertisement for Victoria's Secret. The New York Daily News criticized Anderson for self-promotion.

Contents summary 
The film profiles the lives of 16 notable adult film actresses. Anderson states at the documentary's outset, "This is not a story about pornography…this is a story about women." A quote from Erica Jong is presented at the beginning of the film, "Everyone has talent. What is rare is the courage to follow the talent to the dark place where it leads." The documentary is broken up into two sections: an initial interview with the actresses during makeup and preparation for Anderson's companion photography book, and further interviews during the photo shoot itself. The actresses describe their personal lives and backgrounds, including their love interests and close social connections. Title cards are shown in the film with quotes on its subject matter, including Marlene Dietrich observing, "In America sex is an obsession, in other parts of the world it's a fact." Gloria Leonard is quoted stating, "The difference between pornography and erotica is lighting."

A few of the women describe less than ideal upbringing experiences in their early lives. Katsuni, a French-speaking actress of Asian background, recounts a fairly routine childhood. Adult film star, Francesca Lé, describes early problems from her parents and difficult experiences with recreational drugs. The actresses discuss initial sexual experiences and partners, and discuss their early foray into sexual activity. Some had little knowledge of sexuality or sex itself before entering the industry; others describe early lives based on very conservative religious experiences.

Desires for financial independence and ego are identified as motivating factors to join the adult industry. They recount experiencing ageism in the adult film industry, stating colleagues who had been in the business over eight years, "are already gone". The actresses state it is difficult to engage in relationships with those outside of the industry due to their views on multiple sex partners. The interviews delineate the differences from actual work on an adult film itself, to the way it is presented in the final product to the viewers. Kayden Kross explains she originally felt bashful in her youth, and purposefully constructed a character to portray within adult film to emulate perceived desires from consumers. The actresses take joy from accomplishments garnered while working in the adult film industry. Allie Haze states she wishes to be seen as one of the top performers within her field. Teagan Presley explains that due to the standards within the adult film industry including regular testing for sexually transmitted diseases, she feels they are encouraging viewers to engage in safe sex practices.

They delve into negative aspects of the adult film industry including feeling objectified by others, plastic surgery to improve their appearance for further work in the field, disagreements over their work with their relatives, contracting of sexually-transmitted diseases, and abuse of recreational drugs. Anderson balances the narrative of the interviews against commentary from a talent agent for the adult film industry. Fran Amidor, a representative of actors within the industry, comments on the impact of these experiences on the talent. She states female stars in the industry frequently require mental health counseling and blur the boundaries between their on-set and off-set personalities. Such negative experiences within the industry are shown to cause stress for the performers over periods of time.

Several women recount discrimination they face due to their choice of occupation. The documentary examines the dichotomy of society's obsession with actresses in the adult film industry for sexual gratification, while simultaneously the same actresses face criticism from society for their perceived immorality. One actress tells Anderson, "They don’t understand. We have fans who love us, but we have people who hate us and spit on us." Katsuni reflects on the stigma of entering the industry, lamenting society's "judgment of morality".

Cast

 Lisa Ann
 Belladonna
 Lexi Belle
 Allie Haze  
 Ash Hollywood 
 Jesse Jane
 Katsuni
 Kayden Kross
 Francesca Lé
 Brooklyn Lee
 Asphyxia Noir  
 April O'Neil
 Teagan Presley
 Misty Stone
 Tanya Tate
 Alexis Texas

Production

Inspiration and writing
Prior to her work on Aroused, Anderson gained notice as a celebrity photographer with publications including Room 23 and Hollywood Erotique. Room 23 garnered her praise for her photography of celebrities including Elton John and George Clooney. Her photography work had been featured in publications including Playboy and Vanity Fair. Aroused was her first feature film. She stated her intention was to humanize sex work for the viewers and show the experiences females have to go through to work in the adult industry.

Anderson wanted the viewer to be able to get to know, "the world’s most sexualized women". Anderson was initially motivated to work on the project after previously having photographed a female actress from the adult film industry for a magazine. Anderson got to know the woman, and felt impacted by the nature of her kind demeanor as contrasted against her difficult treatment from members of society due to the stigma of her line of work. Anderson's stated goal through her work on Aroused was to show the female stars of her film were genuine individuals. Anderson explained her thought process, stating, "I wanted to trim away their peacock feathers and show the real girls underneath. By peeling away these women's personas, I show that there is a human being behind the characters they play. And these human beings revel in their sexuality. That's something everyone can learn from." She asserted she wanted to draw attention to a double standard in society of consuming pornography while simultaneously criticizing female porn stars. Anderson observed, "I don't think that we should look at any of these women and judge the choices they make just because they're doing something we wouldn't do. I allow myself to express that maybe it's time to stop pointing the finger and take a look at ourselves."

Casting

Anderson selected her interview subjects in an attempt to feature, "the most successful women in the adult film industry". She interviewed 16 actresses from the adult film industry about their experiences and backgrounds. Anderson selected female adult film stars including: Lisa Ann, Belladonna, Lexi Belle, Allie Haze, Ash Hollywood, Jesse Jane, Katsuni, Kayden Kross, Francesca Lé, Brooklyn Lee, Asphyxia Noir, April O'Neil, Teagan Presley, Misty Stone, Tanya Tate, and Alexis Texas. Anderson additionally interviewed talent agent within the adult film industry, Fran Amidor, for her perspective on female stars within the genre. Ages of the cast members selected by Anderson were from 22 through 41 years.

Throughout the film production, Anderson gained admiration for the assertive females she interviewed for Aroused. Anderson stated she was pleased she had, "created a platform for these women to be heard." Anderson reflected she was heartened to have created a "safe space" for the actresses to open up to her, commenting, "From one woman to another, it became more of a conversation". Kayden Kross commented of being included in Aroused, "any chance we get to show that world in a way that isn't slanted or biased toward making it look like the stereotypical thing you expect from porn--any opportunity is good for us." Allie Haze stated she was optimistic the film could introduce a more varied populace to the humanity of adult film actresses, "Adult performers are always interested in being seen and heard by mainstream audiences ... The difference with Aroused is that a whole new audience could learn something from us."

Filming
During production, the film was known as Aroused, The Aroused Project, and Aroused: The Lost Sensuality of a Woman. In addition to film directing, Anderson also narrated the documentary, and placed herself within the film portraying her photography of the actresses for her erotic coffee table book. The book was intended as a companion piece to the film, and was sold stating the women featured were shown, simply attired only in footwear by Jimmy Choo. Aroused was produced by Anderson, along with Christopher Gallo. She chose to shoot the majority of the documentary in black and white. Later shots in the film are in color, and subsequently in color in muted tones. Filming was shot with the actresses in a rented residence in the Hollywood Hills, Los Angeles, California. Anderson edited the interviews together in a collage style. The director attended an adult film industry convention and shot video of herself at the event to use as video during the end credits of her documentary. Anderson chose to include quotations throughout the film from figures including Joan of Arc, Anaïs Nin, Erica Jong, Marlene Dietrich, and Eleanor Roosevelt. The majority of the film included English-language dialogue with some French with subtitles as well. The film was marketed in a movie trailer as, "an exploration of the lost sensuality of women."

Release
Anderson's companion fine-art photography book associated with the film titled, Aroused: The Lost Sensuality of a Woman, was released before the film itself in 2012. The Aroused film premiere took place on May 1, 2013, at Nuart Theatre of the Landmark Theatres chain in Los Angeles. Many of the female stars of the film were present for the premiere, and stayed after the conclusion of the screening to greet guests and sign the accompanying companion coffee-table book. The documentary film was first released publicly on May 2, 2013. The film had a showing at Grauman's Chinese Theatre in Hollywood, California. Screenings were also shown in 2013 at Village East Cinema in East Village, Manhattan, West End Cinema in Washington, D.C., and Landmark Theatres in Chicago, Illinois, and San Francisco, California.

The film was simultaneously made available on iTunes, with the accompanying book sold on Amazon. The iTunes release was successful, rising to the number three spot on their "documentary most viewed list". The film was not rated by the Motion Picture Association. It was released in DVD format on June 4, 2013, distributed by company Ketchup Entertainment. The DVD rendered the film in 1.78:1 anamorphic widescreen. Audio for the DVD was presented with Dolby Digital 5.1. The DVD included a movie trailer for the film itself. In 2020, Aroused was featured on Amazon Prime and the TV network Showtime in the United States.

Reception 

Aroused received mixed to negative reviews. The film has a 31% "fresh" rating on review aggregator website Rotten Tomatoes.

Writing for the Chicago Tribune, film critic Matt Pais commented on the film's treatment of its female stars that Aroused, "absolutely succeeds in framing them as people who are beautiful, rather than objects that are judged." He compared Aroused to the documentary After Porn Ends, observing it had a more optimistic feel to it about the industry. Chief film critic for Screen Daily, Mark Adams, reviewed the film writing, "Aroused is an intriguing and insightful film."  Adams called it, "an unconventional and refreshing look at the adult film industry". Adams observed of the female stars of the film, "they are aware they are not being exploited and then here is a woman interested in them as women first and foremost." His review concluded of Anderson's work as film director that she, "reveals a candour, honesty and charm to these women that is far beyond the simplistic sexual image they have to portray in their adult films." BroadwayWorld compared and contrasted the actresses and their on-screen personas, "Their true inner vulnerability is touching, yet the characters they have created are confident and intoxicating." Writing for African American Literature Book Club, Kam Williams called the film, "An eye-opening expose about the surprisingly-conventional concerns of some of the most hyper-sexualized women in the world."

Blast Magazine film critic Randy Steinberg wrote, "It's an effort to take the stigma out of what they do, and it is quite effective and compelling." His review called Anderson, "a political documentarian", and compared her style of filmmaking to Michael Moore. Steinberg concluded, "Aroused is a well-made and thoughtful documentary." Writing for ACED Magazine, critic John Delia commented of the film's shooting style, "Beautifully photographed with clean and clear video, the production gets high marks for cinematography." He was critical of the narrative employed by the documentary, calling it biased towards the actresses. Delia posited that the film was a vehicle to market Anderson's accompanying photography book. Edward Frost wrote for CineVue that Anderson had created, "an in-depth portrait of the women she’s chosen to shed light on." He commented positively of Anderson's ability to draw out, "the women’s fluid and thought-provoking testimonies". Writing for Punch Drunk Critics, Mae Abdulbaki commented, "Aroused is well-directed and unique in its content and presentation." Abdulbaki observed, "Anderson does a great job in her directorial debut." She called the director, "an unbiased storyteller, choosing to focus on the industry and the girls’ experiences with it, hoping to take one step closer to shedding a stereotype." Abdulbaki concluded, "Aroused is definitely a documentary worth watching if only for the unique point of view and approach that Anderson chooses to take."

Movie Metropolis film critic James Plath reviewed the film and its accompanying coffee table book, calling them "both tasteful and artistic". Plath compared Anderson's style of cinematography to Annie Leibovitz, in that both treated their subjects with human dignity. He wrote of the film's quality, "Aroused is well done, and like the best documentaries and the best artwork it alters the way you see a subject and the way you think about things." Plath's review concluded, "Aroused is a revealing look at the women of porn, and a sensitive portrayal of what makes them tick." Avi Offer wrote for NYC Movie Guru that Anderson could have spent more time giving more in-depth interviews to a smaller number of subjects. Brent Simon of Shared Darkness wrote, "Aroused is an uncommonly intelligent nonfiction exploration of the inner lives of 16 women in the adult film industry." He compared the documentary to Naked Ambition: An R Rated Look at an X Rated Industry by Michael Grecco, and America Stripped by David Palmer. Simon observed, "Anderson's effort has an easy, unforced quality to go along with its acuity, keeping prurience at arms' length and allowing the humanity and vulnerability of its subjects to come through." AllMovie critic Jason Buchanan gave the film a score of two stars out of five.

Writing for the Los Angeles Times, Sheri Linden commented, "For a film that purports to go beyond the surface and uncover the 'true essence' of adult film stars, Aroused spends a lot of time admiring the surface." Linden observed, "Completist fans of such performers as Alexis Texas, Katsuni and Misty Stone are the only likely viewers liable to find the documentary satisfying." The film was referred by The Village Voice as "a tack better suited to Anderson's famed photo collections than a narrative medium" in which the interviews "are cut into such narrow snippets it's impossible to piece together anyone here into a coherent personality". The Hollywood Reporter wrote that the film "lacks the depth to be much more than a glossily sexy curiosity". According to The Washington Post film critic Michael O'Sullivan, despite being in some moments "surprisingly moving" the film "arouses curiosity without really satisfying it". Ciara LaVelle wrote for Miami New Times, "Overall, this looks more like exploitation than exploration."

The New York Times critic Nicole Herrington compared the film's cinematic style to a television advertisement for Victoria's Secret. Herrington commented, "It has an inviting softness, but the background music, odd camera angles, close-ups and lingering shots only distract and objectify." She wrote that instead of a documentary film, Anderson's piece would have been better suited for the format of television series, in the vein of a combination of Taxicab Confessions and Red Shoe Diaries. Herrington highlighted the humanity of the film's female stars, concluding, "The serious, thoughtful responses carry the film". IndieWire journalist Gabe Toro gave a critical review, commenting, "Aroused works as a beautiful infomercial for the porn industry, mostly serving as a counterpoint to all those troubled 20/20-type hysterical anti-porn news specials that look at the billion dollar smut industry as the collapse of Western civilization." Elizabeth Weitzman reviewed the film for the New York Daily News, and criticized the director's use of the film to promote her own work, "Anderson ... turns a welcome opportunity into a shameless example of exploitation and self-promotion."

See also

List of documentary films
Anti-pornography movement in the United States
Feminist pornography
Feminist views of pornography
Free Speech Coalition
Hot Girls Wanted
The Naked Feminist
Not a Love Story: A Film About Pornography
Pornography in the United States
Sex-positive movement
Sex-positive feminism
Thinking XXX
Women's erotica
Women's pornography

References

Further reading

External links

2013 films
2013 documentary films
2013 directorial debut films
American documentary films
Documentary films about American pornography
Films shot in Los Angeles
Films directed by Deborah Anderson
2010s English-language films
2010s American films